The enzyme aspartate 1-decarboxylase catalyzes the chemical reaction

L-aspartate  beta-alanine + CO2

Hence, this enzyme has one substrate, L-aspartate, and two products, beta-alanine and CO2.

This enzyme belongs to the family of lyases, specifically the carboxy-lyases, which cleave carbon-carbon bonds.  The systematic name of this enzyme class is L-aspartate 1-carboxy-lyase (beta-alanine-forming). Other names in common use include aspartate alpha-decarboxylase, L-aspartate alpha-decarboxylase, aspartic alpha-decarboxylase, and L-aspartate 1-carboxy-lyase.  This enzyme participates in alanine and aspartate metabolism and beta-alanine metabolism.

Structural studies

References

 

EC 4.1.1
Enzymes of known structure